Jean Augustine  (born September 9, 1937) is a Grenada-born Canadian politician. She was the first Black Canadian woman to serve as a federal Minister of the Crown and Member of Parliament.

From 1993 to 2006, Jean Augustine was a Liberal member of the House of Commons of Canada, representing the district of Etobicoke—Lakeshore in Toronto, Ontario. She served as the Minister of State for Multiculturalism and the Status of Women in the Cabinet of Canada from 2002 to 2004 and was the Parliamentary Secretary to Prime Minister Jean Chrétien from 1994 to 1996. Before her election, she had been a school principal.

From 2007 to 2015, she served as the first Fairness Commissioner of Ontario. Following her retirement, she has served as the patron of several non-profit organizations across Canada.

Background & education
Augustine was born on September 9, 1937 in St. George's, Grenada, but immigrated to Canada in 1960 under the West Indian Domestic Scheme. She studied at the University of Toronto where she obtained a Bachelor of Arts and a Master of Education. After university she worked as an elementary school principal with the Metropolitan Separate School Board in Toronto. She was also actively involved in Toronto's Caribbean community, sitting on the first committee to organize the Caribana Festival in 1967.

She has become engaged in numerous organizations for education and social justice, serving with the National Black Coalition of Canada, the Urban Alliance on Race Relations (UARR), the board of governors of York University, the board of trustees for The Hospital for Sick Children, the board of directors of the Donwood Institute, the board of Harbourfront, and chair of the Metro Toronto Housing Authority. She was also named national president of the Congress of Black Women of Canada in 1987.

Jean Augustine’s story is a testament to the power of hard work and devotion in pursuit of social justice.

She was born in St. George’s, Grenada in 1937. She lost her father at a young age and blossomed into an outstanding young student raised by a wise grandmother. In 1960, already a qualified teacher, she immigrated to Canada on the Canada-Caribbean Domestic Program. With focus, she attended Toronto Teachers’ College before earning a Bachelor of Arts degree from the University of Toronto. She earned her Masters in Education while working as an elementary school teacher with the Metropolitan Separate School Board in Toronto. She was later promoted to principal, then Supervisory Officer, where she helped shape the lives of a number of young students; all the while deeply involved in grassroots efforts out in the community. She was married and had two daughters who she continued to raise as a single mother.

Augustine’s contribution expanded to many social causes through her involvement on boards such as that of York University, The Hospital for Sick Children, the Stephen Lewis Foundation and Harbourfront Corporation. She also served as the National President of the Congress of Black Women of Canada. Her capacities and work ethic were recognized by political leaders who began to call upon her for various tasks ranging from the development and launch of Canada's official multiculturalism policy in 1971; to providing advice on cabinet level appointments.

In 1988, she was appointed to chair the Metro Toronto Housing Authority, a multi-million dollar social housing authority serving 300,000 residents in rent-geared to income housing.

In 1993, Jean Augustine made history as the first African-Canadian woman to be elected to Canada’s House of Commons as the Member of Parliament from the Greater Toronto Area constituency of Etobicoke-Lakeshore. She served with distinction winning four consecutive elections until she decided to move on to new challenges in 2006.

Over this period in Parliament, her work included Parliamentary Secretary to the Prime Minister, Minister of Multiculturalism and the Status of Women; Chair of the Foreign Affairs and International Trade committee; Chair of the Human Rights Committee, three-time Chair of the National Women’s Caucus; and in her last year, she was elected Deputy Speaker by her peers. Amongst her notable achievements was legislation to protect disadvantaged low-income individuals including single mothers raising children; securing unanimous legislative support to pass a historic motion designating February as Black History Month in Canada; securing unanimous legislative support to pass a landmark motion to erect the only statue featuring women on Parliament Hill, the Famous Five Monument; and extensive travel and engagement in countries around the world on action and initiatives to ultimately improve the human condition.

Later life
In 2007, Augustine was nominated by the Government of Ontario to become the first Fairness Commissioner, a position created to advocate for Canadians with foreign professional credentials. Augustine retired from the position of Fairness Commissioner in March 2015.

In 2007, Augustine donated her personal records to the Clara Thomas Archives and Special Collections at York University. "Pushing buttons, pushing stories" is a digital exhibit of Augustine's personal political buttons.

In 2008, the Jean Augustine Chair in Education was established in the Faculty of Education at York University.

Augustine serves as the patron, visitor or honorary chair of a number of organizations, including the NATO Association of Canada.

Honours and awards
In 2022, a film  that recapped Jean Augustine's life and achievements was premiered in Toronto and Ottawa with Prime Minister Justin Trudeau as special guest. The creative team behind the team includes documentary filmmakers Fahim Ali, Ali Umair and John Challinor III.
In 2021, Augustine was given the Lifetime Achievement Award from Maclean's Magazine, as part of its 12th annual Parliamentarians of the Year awards.
Augustine was awarded an Honorary Doctor of Laws from her alma mater, University of Toronto. In 2009, she was awarded an Honorary Doctor of Laws from McGill University. In 2017, she was awarded an Honorary Doctor of Laws from Trent University.
She has received the YWCA Woman of Distinction Award, the Kay Livingstone Award, the Ontario Volunteer Award, an African Canadian Achievement Award (Pride News Magazine), the Rubena Willis Special Recognition Award, and the Toronto Lions' Club Onyx Award.
 In 2009, she was made a Member of the Order of Canada "for her distinguished career as an educator, politician and advocate for social justice in Canada".
 She was appointed Commander of the Order of the British Empire (CBE) in the 2014 Birthday Honours for services to education and politics in Grenada, from which she had emigrated 54 years previously.
 The Jean Augustine Scholarship Fund was named for her, which she helps support with fundraising. It assists single mothers to undertake post-secondary study at George Brown College.
 Jean Augustine Secondary School in Brampton, Ontario is named for her.
 Toronto District School Board (TDSB) Girls’ Leadership Academy.
In 2011 Augustine was one of the Top 25 Canadian Immigrant Award winners.

Electoral record

References

External links

How'd They Vote?: Jean Augustine's voting history and quotes
 "Pushing buttons, pushing stories"
2011 Top 25 Canadian Immigrant Awards

1937 births
Living people
Members of the House of Commons of Canada from Ontario
Liberal Party of Canada MPs
Black Canadian politicians
Members of the King's Privy Council for Canada
Members of the Order of Canada
Members of the Order of Ontario
University of Toronto alumni
Grenadian emigrants to Canada
Women members of the House of Commons of Canada
Women in Ontario politics
People from St. George's, Grenada
People from Etobicoke
Politicians from Toronto
Canadian Commanders of the Order of the British Empire
Members of the 26th Canadian Ministry
Members of the 27th Canadian Ministry
Black Canadian women
Women government ministers of Canada
Canadian Roman Catholics
Heads of schools in Canada
21st-century Canadian civil servants
21st-century Canadian women politicians
20th-century Canadian women politicians
African-Canadian feminism